This article is a list of grunge albums and EPs with articles on English Wikipedia. They appear on at least one cited album list and are described as "grunge" by AllMusic. Although citations could be found describing each of these as "grunge", in some cases the designation would be controversial, particularly for those bands that are considered Post-grunge.

In addition, several artists not typically associated with grunge music have released albums displaying a grunge sound, including Manic Street Preachers with Gold Against the Soul (1993),, R.E.M. with Monster (1994), and Def Leppard with Slang (1996).

List of albums

References

 
Grunge